Saratovsky (Harıtaw) is a rural locality (a khutor) in Isimovsky Selsoviet, Kugarchinsky District, Bashkortostan, Russia. The population was 126 as of 2010. There is 1 street.

Geography 
Saratovsky is located 28 km southwest of Mrakovo (the district's administrative centre) by road. Yanaul is the nearest rural locality.

References 

Rural localities in Kugarchinsky District